M&M Militzer & Münch is an international transportation and logistics providers, based in St. Gallen in Switzerland.

Its network consist of more than 100 branch offices in over 35 countries.

Militzer & Münch today offers its services worldwide with an own setup in Western and Eastern Europe, in the Commonwealth of Independent States (CIS), Northern Africa, and the Middle and Far East.

External links
 M&M Militzer & Münch Group website
 M&M Militzer & Münch China website

Transport companies of Switzerland
Logistics companies of Switzerland